John Drayton was an attorney and politician.

John Drayton may also refer to:

Imprisonment of John Drayton, the Australian newspaper editor imprisoned under parliamentary privilege
John Drayton (MP) for Oxfordshire (UK Parliament constituency) and Gloucestershire
John Drayton, founder of Drayton Hall

See also